This is the discography of English rock band Pendragon.

Albums

Live albums

Video albums

Mini-albums

Compilations albums

References

Discographies of British artists
rock music discographies